Rizwan-uz-Zaman Khan (born 4 September 1961) is a former Pakistani cricketer who played in 11 Test matches and three One Day Internationals from 1981 to 1989.

In addition to his first-class cricket career with Pakistan International Airlines, Karachi Whites and Karachi Blues, Rizwan played as a professional with North Yorkshire and South Durham Cricket League club Normanby Hall in 1990.

1961 births
Living people
Pakistan Test cricketers
Pakistan One Day International cricketers
Pakistani cricketers
Sind A cricketers
Sind B cricketers
Karachi Whites cricketers
Pakistan International Airlines B cricketers
Pakistan International Airlines cricketers
Karachi Blues cricketers
Karachi cricketers
Pakistan Starlets cricketers
Cricketers from Karachi